John Wood may refer to:

Architecture
 John Wood, the Elder (1704–1754), English architect
 John Wood, the Younger (1728–1782), English architect
 J. A. Wood (1837–1910), American architect

Education
 John Wood (mathematician) (c.1775–1822), American professor of mathematics
 John Wood (design theorist) (born 1945), British professor of design 
 John C. Wood (born 1949), British professor of mathematics
 John Cunningham Wood (born 1952), Australian professor of economics
 John Wood (activist) (born 1964), education activist, marketing director at Microsoft
 Sir John Wood (professor of law) (1932–2014), British law professor

Entertainment

Acting
 John Wood (actor, born 1909), Australian actor
 John Wood (actor, born 1946), Australian actor who appeared in the police drama Blue Heelers
 John Wood (English actor) (1930–2011), Shakespearean actor
 Mrs. John Wood (1831–1915), British actor
 John Wood, birth name of actor John Fortune

Other entertainment
 John Wood (artist) (1922–2012), American artist
 John Wood (director) (1925–2015), pseudonym of Spanish director Juan Bosch
 John Wood (poet) (born 1947), American poet and historian of photography
 John Wood (record producer), English record producer
 John Philip Wood (died 1838), Scottish antiquary and biographer
 John Muir Wood (1805–1892), Scottish musician, piano manufacturer, and photographer
 John George Wood (1827–1889), British natural history writer
 John Warrington Wood, British sculptor
 John Wood (painter) (1801–1870), English history and portrait painter, see Thomas Stothard

Military
 John M. Wood (general), United States Air Force major general
 John Augustus Wood (1818–1878), British soldier, Victoria Cross recipient
 John Shirley Wood (1888–1966), United States Army general
 John Taylor Wood (1830–1904), U.S. Navy, Confederate Navy

Politics

United States
 John Atwood (colonial administrator) (1576–1644), also known as John Wood, assistant governor of the Plymouth Colony
 John Wood (congressman) (1816–1898), U.S. Representative from Pennsylvania
 John Wood (Florida politician) (born 1952), member of the Florida House of Representatives
 John Wood (governor) (1798–1880), governor of Illinois
 John F. Wood Jr. (born 1936), member of the Maryland House of Delegates
 John J. Wood (1784–1874), U.S. Representative from New York
 John M. Wood (politician) (1813–1864), U.S. Representative from Maine
 John Stephens Wood (1885–1968), chairman of the House Un-American Activities Committee
 John Travers Wood (1878–1954), U.S. Representative from Idaho
 John William Wood Sr. (1855–1928), North Carolina state representative

United Kingdom
 John Wood (MP for Ipswich), English MP for Ipswich in 1420
 John Wood (died 1458), English MP for Worcester and Worcestershire
 John Wood I of Keele, English MP for Newcastle-under-Lyme
 John Wood II of Keele, English MP for Newcastle-under-Lyme
 Sir John Wood (speaker) (died 1484), English MP and Speaker of the House of Commons
 John Wood (Scottish courtier) (died 1570), secretary to Regent Moray
 John Wood (MP for Bossiney) (died 1623), English MP for Bossiney
 John Wood (Isle of Man governor), Governor of the Isle of Man, 1761–1777
 John Wood (MP for Preston) (1789–1856), British MP for Preston
 John Wood (civil servant, born 1790) (1790–1856), British civil servant
 Sir John Wood, 1st Baronet (1857–1951), British Member of Parliament
 John Graeme Wood (1933–2007), British Peoples Party
 Sir John Wood (civil servant, born 1870) (1870–1933), civil servant in the Indian Civil Service

Elsewhere
 John Wood (Australian politician) (1829–1914), Victorian and Tasmanian Legislative Assemblies
 John Fisher Wood (1852–1899), Canadian Member of Parliament from Ontario
 John Wood (diplomat) (born 1944), New Zealand diplomat
 John Barrett Wood, Canadian politician in the province of Alberta in Alberta general election, 1948
 John George Corry Wood, English-born political figure in British Columbia

Science
 John Wood (surgeon) (1825–1891), British surgeon at King's College Hospital
 John Henry Wood (1841–1914), English entomologist
 John L. Wood (born 1964), American chemist
 John Medley Wood (1827–1915), South African botanist
 John Nicholas Wood, British neurobiologist
 John Turtle Wood (1821–1890), British architect, engineer, and archaeologist

Sports

Cricket
 John Wood (Surrey cricketer, born 1744) (1744–1793), English cricketer
 John Wood (Kent cricketer, born 1745) (1745–1816), English cricketer
 John Wood (New Zealand cricketer) (1839–1909), New Zealand cricketer
 John Wood (Australian cricketer) (1865–1928), Australian cricketer
 John Wood (civil servant, born 1870) (1870–1933), English cricketer
 John Wood (cricketer, born 1970), English cricketer

Football
 John Thomas Archer Wood (c. 1872–1954), English footballer 
 John Wood (footballer, born 1880) (1880–1916), English footballer
 John Wood (footballer, born 1884) (1884–1959), English footballer
 John Wood (footballer, born 1948), English footballer
 John Wood (Scottish footballer) (1894–1971), Scottish forward
 John Wood (American football) (born 1951), American football player
 Jackie Wood (1919–1993), real name Edward John Wood, footballer

Other sports
 John Wood (baseball) (1872–1929), baseball player
 John Wood (canoeist) (1950–2013), Canadian Olympic flatwater canoer
 John Wood (racing driver) (born 1952), CART driver
 John Wood (rugby league) (born 1956), Great Britain, and Leigh
 Jon Wood (born 1981), NASCAR driver

Other
 John Wood (cormorant keeper), servant of James VI and I
 John Wood (millowner) (1758–?), created the Howard Town Mills complex in Glossop, England
 John Wood (Bradford manufacturer) (1793–1871), English industrialist and factory reformer
 John Wood (explorer) (1812–1871), Scottish explorer of central Asia
 John B. Wood (1827–1884), American journalist
 John H. Wood Jr. (1916–1979), U.S. federal judge
 John Wood (photographer) (dates unknown), Civil War photographer for Union Army
 John Wood, subject of Finders Keepers (2015 film)
 John D Wood & Co., a UK estate agents

See also
 Jonathan Wood (born 1982), Australian actor
 Jonathan Wood (hedge fund manager), founder of SRM Global
 John Woods (disambiguation)